Myroides marinus is a Gram-negative, rod-shaped, aerobic and non-motile bacterium from the genus of Myroides which has been isolated from seawater.

References

Flavobacteria
Bacteria described in 2011